Richard ffrench-Constant FRS is professor of molecular natural history at the University of Exeter.

References

External links 
https://www.researchgate.net/profile/Richard_Ffrench-Constant2

Living people
Academics of the University of Exeter
Fellows of the Royal Society
Year of birth missing (living people)
Alumni of Imperial College London
Alumni of the University of Southampton
Alumni of the University of Exeter
Academics of the University of Bath